Biel/Bienne District is an administrative district in the Canton of Bern, Switzerland. It is located along both shores of the northeastern half of Lake Biel and is part of the Seeland administrative region, and its capital is Biel/Bienne. While it is the smallest district in surface area, it has the third largest population in the canton.

The present Biel/Bienne Verwaltungskreis ("administrative district") was created on 1 January 2010, consisting of the entirety of one former Amtsbezirke ("district"), Biel, about half of another, Nidau and three municipalities of Büren.

References

Districts of the canton of Bern